

Released films
The following is a list of Malayalam films released in the year 2008.

Dubbed films

References

2008
Malyalam
 2008
2008 in Indian cinema